Major-General Sir Luke O'Connor,  (20 January 1831 – 1 February 1915) was an Irish soldier who served in the British Army. He was the first soldier to receive the Victoria Cross, Britain's highest award for gallantry in the face of the enemy.

Background
Luke O'Connor was born in Kilcroy, Hillstreet, in the parish of Aughrim, Co Roscommon in Ireland. He was born to James O'Connor (born 1800) and Mary Gannon. He and his family were evicted from their farm because they were unable to pay the rent and decided to move to North America in 1839 in search of opportunity. His father James died at sea en route and his mother and a baby brother died at Grosse Isle, Quebec on arrival of cholera. Although Luke returned to Ireland as a boy, some of his other siblings remained in North America and fought in the American Civil War.

Military
He enlisted in the British Army as a young man. At the age of 23, he was a sergeant in the 23rd Regiment of Foot (later The Royal Welch Fusiliers). During the Crimean War, the 23rd Foot were part of the British force sent to the Crimea. On 20 September 1854, at the Battle of the Alma, Sergeant O'Connor was advancing between two officers, carrying the Colour, when one of them was mortally wounded. Sergeant O'Connor was also shot at the same time, but recovering himself, he snatched up the Colour from the ground and continued to carry it until the end of the action, although urged to retire to the rear on account of his wounds. He also acted with great gallantry at the assault on the Redan (8 September 1855) where he was shot through both thighs.

The Victoria Cross did not exist at that time, but when it was created in 1856 O'Connor was one of the 62 Crimean veterans invested with it during a ceremony in Hyde Park. He was the first recipient from the Army, as opposed to the Royal Navy.

He later achieved the rank of major-general and was appointed Colonel of his old regiment on 3 June 1914. His Victoria Cross is displayed at the Royal Welch Fusiliers Museum in Caernarfon Castle, Gwynedd, Wales.

Death
He died in Clarges Street, London, on 1 February 1915. He is buried at St Mary's Catholic Cemetery, Kensal Green, London.

See also
Irish in the British Armed Forces

References

The Register of the Victoria Cross (1981, 1988 and 1997)
Clarke, Brian (1986). The Irish Sword

External links
Location of grave and VC medal (W. London)
Luke O'Connor page in Helen's Family Trees website

1831 births
1915 deaths
Military personnel from County Roscommon
19th-century Irish people
Irish officers in the British Army
People from County Roscommon
Royal Welch Fusiliers soldiers
British Army generals
Crimean War recipients of the Victoria Cross
Irish recipients of the Victoria Cross
British Army personnel of the Crimean War
British military personnel of the Indian Rebellion of 1857
British military personnel of the Third Anglo-Ashanti War
Knights Commander of the Order of the Bath
Royal Welch Fusiliers officers
British Army recipients of the Victoria Cross
Burials at St Mary's Catholic Cemetery, Kensal Green